Chieftains Museum, also known as the Major Ridge Home, is a two-story white frame house built around a log house of 1792 in Cherokee country (today it is within present-day Rome, Georgia, United States of America). It was the home of the Cherokee leader Major Ridge. He was notable for his role in negotiating and signing the Treaty of New Echota of 1835, which ceded the remainder of Cherokee lands in the Southeast to the United States.  He was part of a minority group known as the Treaty Party, who believed that relocation was inevitable and wanted to negotiate the best deal with the United States for their people. 

The chiefs had agreed they could not go to war against the United States on the removal issue, but most other Cherokee opposed Ridge and the Treaty Party. He and some other members of the Treaty Party were assassinated after most of the tribe was removed to what became the Cherokee Nation in Indian Territory, for having ceded the tribe's communal lands, as this was considered a capital crime.

Description

Major Ridge's first house here was small and built of handhewn logs, in the dogtrot style. He made later additions to formally enclose the dogtrot and added extensions at each side, creating a white wood-frame two-story house. This was the "Big House" of his busy 223-acre plantation, the property of which extended to the banks of the Oostanaula River, upstream of its confluence with the Etowah River, which forms the Coosa River. The house was declared a National Historic Landmark in 1973.

The Major Ridge Home was purchased for preservation by the Junior League of Rome. In 1971 it was adapted for use as a historic house museum, known as the "Chieftains Museum". In 2002 the museum was designated by the National Park Service as an official site on the "Cherokee Trail of Tears National Historic Trail," which had been established in 1987.  

The building was renamed as Chieftains Museum / Major Ridge Home in his honor.  The museum's exhibits focus on Major Ridge and 19th-century Cherokee life and culture. Ridge's plantation had extended to the river, which he used for travel and transport of his cotton to market. An eight-acre area along the river is now part of Riverside Park in Rome, Georgia.

See also
 Cherokee Nation (19th century)
 History of Rome, Georgia
 List of National Historic Landmarks in Georgia (U.S. state)
 National Register of Historic Places listings in Floyd County, Georgia

References

External links

 Chieftains Museum web site
 Chieftains historical marker

National Historic Landmarks in Georgia (U.S. state)
Houses completed in 1792
Historic house museums in Georgia (U.S. state)
18th century Cherokee history
19th century Cherokee history
Native American history of Georgia (U.S. state)
Native American museums in Georgia (U.S. state)
Museums in Rome, Georgia
Dogtrot architecture in Georgia (U.S. state)
1971 establishments in Georgia (U.S. state)
Museums established in 1971
Trail of Tears
Houses in Floyd County, Georgia
National Register of Historic Places in Floyd County, Georgia